The 2021 ConIFA No Limits Mediterranean Futsal Cup was the first futsal tournament organized by the Confederation of Independent Football Associations. It was hosted in Sanremo and won by the County of Nice national football team.

Tournament 
The tournament was organized by the CONIFA No Limits area directed by Francesco Zema. It was part of a socio-cultural exhibition co-organized by the project "Calci: Comunità Resilienti" with the collaboration of the Principality of Seborga.

The event took place on 11 September 2021 and was broadcast on internet thanks to the media partner WeSport.it.

Participants 
{| class="wikitable" style="width:50%"
|-
!width=25%|CONIFA teams
!width=25%|Invited teams
|-
|

 Elba
 Sardinia
 Sicily
|
 Seborga
 Terra brigasca

The participants have been drawn into 2 groups of 3. The top teams from each group advanced to the final.

The tournament marked the official debut of the national teams of Sicily and Elba in a CONIFA competition.

Matches

Group A

Group B

Fifth-Place play-off

Third-Place play-off

Final

References 

Confederation of Independent Football Associations
International futsal competitions hosted by Italy
Futsal competitions in Europe